"Through the Late Night" (stylized in all lowercase) is a song by American rapper Travis Scott featuring American rapper Kid Cudi. It was released on September 2, 2016 from the former's second studio album Birds in the Trap Sing McKnight. The song marks the first of several collaborations between the two rappers.

Composition
The song features humming in the chorus from Kid Cudi, who sings the refrain, "Sleep through day, then we play all through the late night". It finds the rappers singing about partying at late nights, with references to drugs, namely lysergic acid diethylamide. Travis Scott also interpolates Cudi's "Day 'n' Nite" in his verse.

Critical reception
The song was met with generally favorable reviews. Kid Cudi's humming was particularly praised; Preezy Brown of XXL added that his "lyrical ability is on display here" as well. Critics commented that Travis Scott had unclear lyrics in the song. However, regarding one of Scott's lines, Matthew Strauss of Pitchfork wrote that "Because he does not provide great detail or context as to why he's in dire need of salvation, it comes off as both grandiose and vacuous, which, at best, is just really fun to listen to."

Charts

Certifications

References

2016 songs
Travis Scott songs
Kid Cudi songs
Songs written by Travis Scott
Songs written by Kid Cudi
Songs written by Cardo (record producer)
Songs written by Kevin Gomringer
Songs written by Tim Gomringer
Songs written by Dot da Genius
Song recordings produced by Cardo (record producer)
Song recordings produced by Cubeatz
Songs about drugs